The 2022 Ramudden World RX of Norway was the fifst round of the ninth season of the FIA World Rallycross Championship. It was also inaugural race in new RX1e top category. The event was held at the Lånkebanen near Hell, Nord-Trøndelag. The World RallyCross Championship's electric era started at Norway's Hell track on 13-14 August after delays to allow teams to ready their new cars.

World RX1e Championship 

Source

Heats

Progression 

 Race 1

 Race 2

Semi-finals 

 Semi-Final 1

 Semi-Final 2

 Note: Klara Andersson progressed to the Final race as one of two placed trird Semi-Finals drivers with better result in Progression Round.

Final

Standings after the event 

Source

 Note: Only the top five positions are included.

References 

|- style="text-align:center"
|width="35%"|Previous race:2021 World RX of Germany
|width="40%"|FIA World Rallycross Championship2022 season
|width="35%"|Next race:2022 World RX of Riga-Latvia
|- style="text-align:center"
|width="35%"|Previous race:2019 World RX of Norway
|width="40%"|World RX of Norway
|width="35%"|Next race:-
|- style="text-align:center"

Norway
World RX
2022 in Norwegian sport